Q'umir Pata (Quechua, q'umir green, pata elevated place / above, at the top / edge, bank (of a river), shore, "green elevated place" or "green shore", also spelled Khomerpata) is a mountain in the north of the Apolobamba mountain range in Bolivia, about  high. It is located in the La Paz Department, Franz Tamayo Province, Pelechuco Municipality, near the Peruvian border. Q'umir Pata lies southeast of the mountains Surapata and Kulli Pata and south of Chawpi Urqu.

References 

Mountains of La Paz Department (Bolivia)